Amata vicarians is a species of moth of the family Erebidae first described by Jeremy Daniel Holloway in 1988. It is found on Borneo.

Subspecies
Amata vicarians vicarians
Amata vicarians api Holloway, 1988 (Sarawak)
Amata vicarians pagon (Holloway, 1988) (Brunei)

References 

Vicar
Moths of Borneo
Moths described in 1988